Joseph Smothers was a Baptist minister and state legislator in Mississippi. He represented Claiborne County in the Mississippi House of Representatives from 1872 to 1875.

He was born in Kentucky. He lived in Port Gibson, Mississippi.

See also
African-American officeholders during and following the Reconstruction era

References

People from Port Gibson, Mississippi
Year of birth missing
Year of death missing
African-American politicians during the Reconstruction Era
African-American state legislators in Mississippi
Members of the Mississippi House of Representatives
Baptist ministers from the United States
Baptists from Mississippi